In geometry and polyhedral combinatorics, the Kleetope of a polyhedron or higher-dimensional convex polytope  is another polyhedron or polytope  formed by replacing each facet of  with a shallow pyramid. Kleetopes are named after Victor Klee.

Examples
The triakis tetrahedron is the Kleetope of a  tetrahedron, the triakis octahedron is the Kleetope of an octahedron, and the triakis icosahedron is the Kleetope of an icosahedron. In each of these cases the Kleetope is formed by adding a triangular pyramid to each face of the original polyhedron.

The tetrakis hexahedron is the Kleetope of the cube, formed by adding a square pyramid to each of its faces, and the pentakis dodecahedron is the Kleetope of the dodecahedron, formed by adding a pentagonal pyramid to each face of the dodecahedron.

The base polyhedron of a Kleetope does not need to be a Platonic solid. For instance, the disdyakis dodecahedron is the Kleetope of the rhombic dodecahedron, formed by replacing each rhombus face of the dodecahedron by a rhombic pyramid, and the disdyakis triacontahedron is the Kleetope of the rhombic triacontahedron. In fact, the base polyhedron of a Kleetope does not need to be Face-transitive, as can be seen from the tripentakis icosidodecahedron above.

The Goldner–Harary graph may be represented as the graph of vertices and edges of the Kleetope of the triangular bipyramid.

Definitions
One method of forming the Kleetope of a polytope  is to place a new vertex outside , near the centroid of each facet. If all of these new vertices are placed close enough to the corresponding centroids, then the only other vertices visible to them will be the vertices of the facets from which they are defined.

Properties and applications
More specifically, if the number of vertices of a -dimensional polytope  is at least , then  is dimensionally unambiguous.

In particular, the Kleetope of any three-dimensional polyhedron is a simplicial polyhedron, a polyhedron in which all facets are triangles.

Kleetopes may be used to generate polyhedra that do not have any Hamiltonian cycles: any path through one of the vertices added in the Kleetope construction must go into and out of the vertex through its neighbors in the original polyhedron, and if there are more new vertices than original vertices then there are not enough neighbors to go around. In particular, the Goldner–Harary graph, the Kleetope of the triangular bipyramid, has six vertices added in the Kleetope construction and only five in the bipyramid from which it was formed, so it is non-Hamiltonian; it is the simplest possible non-Hamiltonian simplicial polyhedron. The same technique shows that in any higher dimension , there exist simplicial polytopes with shortness exponent . Similarly,  used the Kleetope construction to provide an infinite family of examples of simplicial polyhedra with an even number of vertices that have no perfect matching.

Kleetopes also have some extreme properties related to their vertex degrees: if each edge in a planar graph is incident to at least seven other edges, then there must exist a vertex of degree at most five all but one of whose neighbors have degree 20 or more, and the Kleetope of the Kleetope of the icosahedron provides an example in which the high-degree vertices have degree exactly 20.

Notes

References
.
. See also the same journal 6(2):33 (1975) and 8:104-106 (1977). Reference from listing of Harary's publications.
.
.
.
.

Polyhedra
Polytopes